Xiliuhu (literally Xiliu Lake) is a metro station of Zhengzhou Metro Line 1.

The station was the western terminus of Line 1 before the opening of phase II project of Line 1 in January 2017.

Station layout 
The station has 2 floors underground. The B1 floor is for the station concourse and the B2 floor is for the platforms and tracks. The station has one island platform and two tracks for Line 1. Some trains during peak hours still terminate at this station.

Platform 2 serves as the terminus for some interval trains during rush hours in weekdays.

Exits

Surroundings
Xiliuhu Park

References

Stations of Zhengzhou Metro
Line 1, Zhengzhou Metro
Railway stations in China opened in 2013